Jim Murple Memorial is a French ska and R&B band formed in Paris in 1996. Although French, most of their song lyrics are in English.

Venues and festivals
They have performed in numerous venues and have played at several music festivals including:

 Les Vieilles Charrues, Le Printemps de Bourges, Festival du Bout du Monde
 Crozon, Artrock
 St-Brieuc States of Rock
 Évreux, FestiVal de Marne
 Champigny, Festival Elephants 3
 Lassay-les-Trois-Chateaux, Chorus Hauts-de-Seine
 Vanves, Jazz of Defense
 Coutances (Manche) Jazz sous les Pommiers

To celebrate 10 years of recording history, they are releasing a new vinyl-only album in April, 2008, entitled "Spapadoo-Hey!! Spadoo-Oh!"

Albums
 4 - MaAuLa Records (2020)
Put Things Right - Pias France 2007
 Five'n'Yellow - Pias France (2005)
 Trop Jolie - Pias France (2004)
 Let's Spend Some Love - PIAS France (2003)
 Play The Roots - Patate Records/Tripsichord (2001)
 The Story Of Jim Murple Memorial - Patate Records/Tripsichord (1999)
 Rhythm'n'Blues Jamaïcain - Patate Records/Tripsichord (1998)
 Let's Spend Some Love 33T vinyle - PIAS France (2003)
 Let's Skank Volume 4 - Patate Records (2004)
 Let's Skank Volume 3 - Patate Records (2002)
 Ska Heroes - Emi (2003)
 Let's Skank Volume 2 - Patate Records (2002)
 Kongpilation Hors-série - 10 ans de Banana Juice (2002)
 10 ans de la Ferarock - Recall/Virgin (2002)
 Global Ska 2 - Revelde Records - SP (2002)
 It's A Frenchy Ska Reggae Party 3 - Big Mama Records/Tripsichord (2002)
 Ska Story - Virgin/Emi (2002)
 Hexagone Riddim - Wagram (2001)
 Mega reggae - Wagram (2001)
 Sur Les Roots De France - Virgin (2000)
 Danse Ska La -
 The Complete Box Set - Patate Records/Tripsichord (2003)

External links
 Official site
 MySpace page

Musical groups from Paris